In this table, the "Season" column refers to the league season for which financial data is able and referenced, which is usually not the most recently completed season of competition. Revenue are listed in millions of euros. The "Level on pyramid" refers to the importance/division in their respective countries/leagues. For example, Fußball-Bundesliga is the first division/level, compared to 2. Fußball-Bundesliga (which is the second division/level).

List 

Notes

See also 
 Major professional sports leagues in the United States and Canada
 Deloitte Football Money League
 Forbes' list of the most valuable football clubs
 Forbes' list of the most valuable sports teams
 Forbes' list of the world's highest-paid athletes
 List of largest sports contracts
 List of attendance figures at domestic professional sports leagues
 List of sports attendance figures

References

External links
Major League Soccer, Adidas Agree To $700 Million Extension

professional
Leagues

Professional